Bluecap or blue cap may refer to:

 Bluecap, a fairy or ghost in English folklore
 Bluecap (bushranger), an Australian bushranger
 Bluecap Memorial, a memorial to a foxhound in Cheshire, England
 The Bluecaps, a band formed by American musician Gene Vincent